The 104th district of the Texas House of Representatives represents central and eastern Grand Prairie, and a portion of west Dallas. The current Representative is Jessica Gonzalez, who has represented the district since 2019.

Mountain Creek Lake is within the district.

References 

104